Andrey Dzivakow (born 7 October 1978) is a former Belarusian professional footballer.

Honours
BATE Borisov
Belarusian Premier League champion: 1999

External links
Profile at teams.by

1978 births
Living people
Belarusian footballers
Association football defenders
FC Ataka Minsk players
FC Kommunalnik Slonim players
FC BATE Borisov players
FC Torpedo-BelAZ Zhodino players
FC Vitebsk players
FC Minsk players
FC Osipovichi players